Lentate sul Seveso is a comune (municipality) in the Province of Monza and Brianza in the Italian region Lombardy, located about  north of Milan.

Lentate sul Seveso borders the following municipalities: Mariano Comense, Carimate, Cermenate, Novedrate, Cabiate, Meda, Lazzate, Misinto, Barlassina, Cogliate. Sights include the Oratories of Mocchirolo and Santo Stefano, as well as the Villa Valdettaro. The Oratory of Santo Stefano contains a cycle of 14th century frescoes.

Lentate is served by the Camnago-Lentate railway station.

References

External links
 Official website